Electrophorus voltai is a species of electric eel found in South America. It is the strongest known bioelectricity generator in nature.

Taxonomy 
It was previously classified within Electrophorus electricus when that species was considered the only one in the genus Electrophorus, but a 2019 analysis described it and E. varii as distinct species based on both their deep genetic divergences and differences in the voltage produced by each species. It is thought to have diverged from its sister species E. electricus during the Pliocene. It is named in honor of the physicist Alessandro Volta, who is widely credited as the creator of the electric battery.

Distribution 
It inhabits upland habitats, primarily north-flowing rivers of the Brazilian Shield, but also some south-flowing rivers of the Guiana Shield. In some streams of the Guiana Shield, it is sympatric with E. varii.

Description 
It closely resembles E. electricus but differs in skull morphology, including having a depressed skull and a wide head. It has a maximum voltage of 860 volts, making it not only the strongest bioelectricity generator of the three electric eel species, but also of any animal. Males get larger then females by about 35 cm (14 in)

Behavior 
A 2021 study reported the first known occurrence of pack hunting by electric eels in a population of E. voltai at the mouth of the Iriri River in Brazil.

References 

Gymnotidae
Electrophoridae
Strongly electric fish
Freshwater fish of Brazil
Fish of French Guiana
Freshwater fish of Venezuela
Fish of Guyana
Fish of Suriname
Taxa named by Carlos David Canabarro Machado de Santana
Taxa named by William Gareth Richard Crampton
Taxa named by Wolmar B. Wosiacki
Taxa named by Mark Henry Sabaj Pérez
Taxa named by Casey B. Dillman
Taxa named by Natália Castro e Castro
Taxa named by Douglas A. Bastos
Taxa named by Richard Peter Vari
Fish described in 2019
Alessandro Volta